The B.S. Report was an ESPN podcast, that occasionally touched on mature subjects,  hosted by Bill Simmons. It featured interviews with athletes, sports commentators, pop-culture experts and friends of Simmons. The B.S. Report had no fixed publication schedule, however there were generally 2 or 3 episodes posted per week.  As of 2009, 'The B.S. Report' was ESPN's most-downloaded podcast, with over 10 million downloads through June.

Occasionally, Simmons had significant guests from the sports world, such as NBA Commissioner David Stern, or NBA Players Association head Billy Hunter.

AVclub.com named The B.S. Report one of the best podcasts of 2010.

Format
The B.S. Report opens with a theme song written and performed by Ronald Jenkees and a voice-over announcement that the podcast "is a free-flowing conversation that occasionally touches on mature subjects." Simmons rarely performs a monologue, but instead holds a conversation with one or more guests for the entire episode.

Most B.S. Report episodes are based on discussions of sports, but occasionally Simmons will have entertainers or pop-culture observers on to talk about entertainment issues of the day, such as Saturday Night Live, reality television, movies and music.

Episodes

References

ESPN.com